"Sunday" is a song by English musical duo Hurts. It was released on 27 February 2011 as the fourth single from their debut album, Happiness (2010). Despite the moderate chart success, the song received mixed response from critics, who complimented the sound of the song, but criticized the lyrics. Some of them called it flimsy and thought it was bland, and noted that the song has "lack of depth".

Critical reception
"Sunday" received generally mixed reviews from music critics. Alix Buscovic of BBC Music described the song as a "power-dressed Europop floor-filler that channels early Depeche Mode and the PSB", which was made with "theatricality" and "a brooding demeanour", but criticized the lyrics. PopMatters reviewer Joe Copplestone compared the track to New Order, deeming it "gleefully era-authentic" and commending its commercial appeal.

While commenting on the "lack of depth" of the lyrics in Happiness, Sam Shepherd from musicOMH praised Anderson's work, with the song's mix of "Eastern Bloc industrial pomp with Eurovision disco pop" having a "surprisingly engaging effect." In the Drowned in Sound review, Andrzej Lukowski considers "Sunday" to cross into "boyband territory", having "a decent hi-NRG synth line", nevertheless a "desperately gauche" feature. Similarly, Alexis Petridis from The Guardian felt it was "flimsy and commonplace", stating that, similar to the other albums tracks, it's a "climax" without any "build-up".

Music video
The music video was directed by W.I.Z., who also directed the duo's first video, "Better Than Love" in 2010. It was filmed in Romania, at MediaPro Studios. Theo Hutchcraft stated that the video follows a similar theme to the group's others, adding "it's nice to go away to film the videos because you live in a different world for a few days[...] We go to an exotic, beautiful place, think of a theme that no-one else will understand except us, and surround us with women so people won't ask us what it's about!"

Live performances
Hurts performed the single live at The Graham Norton Show, which was their first performance of the song on a television programme.

Track listings
CD single
"Sunday"
"Live Like Horses"

7" single
"Sunday"
"Sunday" (Seamus Haji Remix)

Digital bundle
"Sunday"
"Sunday" (Seamus Haji Remix)
"Sunday" (Midland Remix)
"Sunday" (Tom Flynn Remix)
"Sunday" (Glam As You Radio Mix)

Charts

References

2010s ballads
2010 songs
2011 singles
Hurts songs
RCA Records singles
Songs about heartache
Songs about loneliness
Synth-pop ballads
Songs written by Theo Hutchcraft